Burnout Syndromes (stylised as BURNOUT SYNDROMES when romanized) is a Japanese rock band formed on May 4, 2005 in Osaka. The band consists of guitarist and vocalist Kazuumi Kumagai (熊谷和海), bassist Taiyu Ishikawa (石川大裕), and drummer Takuya Hirose (廣瀬拓哉). They have released two albums by Epic Records Japan and were part of the original soundtrack of the anime Haikyu!! in its second season.

On January 3, 2020, they participated at the online festival Nippon Budokan, organized by Sony Music. On January 31, 2020, the band premiered its single "Phoenix" on YouTube, used as the opening for the TV anime series Haikyu!!.

Overview

In 2005, Ishikawa asked Kazuumi to form a band. They were classmates in junior high school. Later, Hirose joined the band. He was a classmate of Ishikawa in elementary school. Their first goal was to get the attention of the girls at a school festival. However, the festival was canceled due to a flu outbreak. Afterwards, they keep practicing to become good enough to get offers for anime.

In the beginning, their music wasn't popular due to the fact that they only pursued the music that they want to create, but they still became popular after some time. In recent years they have started playing electronic music after learning how to use a sequencer.

The band have written songs for popular anime outside of Japan such as Haikyu!!, Dr. Stone, and Gintama They experiment with genres like techno, ambient, hip-hop, and ethnic in their album material. They also performed the opening song of Super HxEros anime.

Discography

Albums

Studio albums

Singles

Awards and nominations

References

External links
 
 

2005 establishments in Japan
Japanese alternative rock groups
Japanese musical trios
Japanese rock music groups
Musical groups established in 2005
Musical groups from Osaka Prefecture
Japanese power pop groups